The International Convention on the Harmonization of Frontier Controls of Goods is a 1982 United Nations Economic Commission for Europe (UNECE) treaty whereby states agree to co-operate in harmonizing and simplifying international border control. For goods in transit, the states that ratify the Convention agree to implement "simple and speedy treatment ... by limiting their inspections to cases where these are warranted by the actual circumstances or risks".

The Convention was developed by the Inland Transport Committee of the UNECE concluded at Geneva on 21 October 1982. It was signed by 13 states and entered into force on 15 October 1985. It is open to ratification by any state and as of 2016 has 58 parties, which includes 57 states plus the European Union. A number of states outside of UNECE have ratified the treaty.

External links
Text
Ratifications

1982 in Switzerland
Customs treaties
Treaties concluded in 1982
Treaties entered into force in 1985
United Nations Economic Commission for Europe treaties
Treaties of Albania
Treaties of Armenia
Treaties of Austria
Treaties of Azerbaijan
Treaties of Belarus
Treaties of Belgium
Treaties of Bosnia and Herzegovina
Treaties of Bulgaria
Treaties of Croatia
Treaties of Cuba
Treaties of Cyprus
Treaties of the Czech Republic
Treaties of Czechoslovakia
Treaties of Denmark
Treaties of Estonia
Treaties entered into by the European Union
Treaties of Finland
Treaties of France
Treaties of Georgia (country)
Treaties of West Germany
Treaties of East Germany
Treaties of Greece
Treaties of the Hungarian People's Republic
Treaties of Iran
Treaties of Ireland
Treaties of Italy
Treaties of Jordan
Treaties of Kazakhstan
Treaties of Kyrgyzstan
Treaties of Laos
Treaties of Latvia
Treaties of Lesotho
Treaties of Liberia
Treaties of Lithuania
Treaties of Luxembourg
Treaties of Mongolia
Treaties of Montenegro
Treaties of Morocco
Treaties of the Netherlands
Treaties of Norway
Treaties of Poland
Treaties of Portugal
Treaties of Moldova
Treaties of Romania
Treaties of the Soviet Union
Treaties of Serbia and Montenegro
Treaties of Slovakia
Treaties of Slovenia
Treaties of South Africa
Treaties of Spain
Treaties of Sweden
Treaties of Switzerland
Treaties of Tajikistan
Treaties of North Macedonia
Treaties of Tunisia
Treaties of Turkey
Treaties of Turkmenistan
Treaties of Ukraine
Treaties of the United Kingdom
Treaties of Uzbekistan
Treaties of Yugoslavia
Treaties extended to West Berlin
Treaties extended to the Faroe Islands
Treaties extended to Greenland
Treaties extended to Aruba
Treaties extended to the Netherlands Antilles
Treaties extended to Liechtenstein
Treaties extended to Guernsey
Treaties extended to the Isle of Man
Treaties extended to Jersey
Treaties extended to Gibraltar
Treaties extended to Montserrat
Treaties extended to Saint Helena, Ascension and Tristan da Cunha
October 1982 events